Stallion Springs is a census-designated place (CDP) in the Tehachapi Mountains, in Kern County, California, USA. The population was 2,488 at the 2010 census, up from 1,522 at the 2000 census. Stallion Springs is located in the greater Tehachapi Area.

Geography

Law enforcement
The area is patrolled by the Stallion Springs Police Department which was established in 1972. The Stallion Springs Police Department is a California Peace Officer Standards and Training fully certified department. They provide the community and the surrounding schools, drug intervention classes, social media safety classes, and gang information classes. They also have a Police Activities League (PAL) and a Neighborhood Watch Program. The Community Services Unit, established in 2014, assists the police department with administrative duties and some patrol activities

Demographics

2010
At the 2010 census Stallion Springs had a population of 2,488. The racial makeup of Stallion Springs was 2,239 (90.0%) White, 30 (1.2%) African American, 26 (1.0%) Native American, 32 (1.3%) Asian, 7 (0.3%) Pacific Islander, 79 (3.2%) from other races, and 75 (3.0%) from two or more races. Hispanic or Latino of any race were 285 people (11.5%).

The whole population lived in households, no one lived in non-institutionalized group quarters and no one was institutionalized.

There were 1,004 households, 275 (27.4%) had children under the age of 18 living in them, 657 (65.4%) were opposite-sex married couples living together, 58 (5.8%) had a female householder with no husband present, 42 (4.2%) had a male householder with no wife present.  There were 48 (4.8%) unmarried opposite-sex partnerships, and 8 (0.8%) same-sex married couples or partnerships. 194 households (19.3%) were one person and 87 (8.7%) had someone living alone who was 65 or older. The average household size was 2.48.  There were 757 families (75.4% of households); the average family size was 2.84.

The age distribution was 522 people (21.0%) under the age of 18, 141 people (5.7%) aged 18 to 24, 510 people (20.5%) aged 25 to 44, 801 people (32.2%) aged 45 to 64, and 514 people (20.7%) who were 65 or older.  The median age was 46.7 years. For every 100 females, there were 95.8 males.  For every 100 females age 18 and over, there were 96.4 males.

There were 1,204 housing units at an average density of 73.2 per square mile, of the occupied units 862 (85.9%) were owner-occupied and 142 (14.1%) were rented. The homeowner vacancy rate was 5.4%; the rental vacancy rate was 10.0%.  2,056 people (82.6% of the population) lived in owner-occupied housing units and 432 people (17.4%) lived in rental housing units.

2000
At the 2000 census there were 1,522 people, 586 households, and 469 families living in the CDP. The racial makeup of the CDP was 90.21% White, 0.92% Black or African American, 0.99% Native American, 1.12% Asian, 0.07% Pacific Islander, 2.83% from other races, and 3.88% from two or more races. 11.04% of the population were Hispanic or Latino of any race.
Of the 586 households 31.1% had children under the age of 18 living with them, 70.0% were married couples living together, 6.7% had a female householder with no husband present, and 19.8% were non-families. 16.4% of households were one person and 7.8% were one person aged 65 or older. The average household size was 2.60 and the average family size was 2.91.

The age distribution was 26.3% under the age of 18, 4.3% from 18 to 24, 24.1% from 25 to 44, 23.7% from 45 to 64, and 21.6% 65 or older. The median age was 42 years. For every 100 females, there were 101.9 males. For every 100 females age 18 and over, there were 101.3 males.

The median household income was $51,029 and the median family income  was $53,958. Males had a median income of $53,162 versus $37,708 for females. The per capita income for the CDP was $18,592. About 3.4% of families and 5.3% of the population were below the poverty line, including 1.8% of those under age 18 and 9.9% of those age 65 or over.

References

Census-designated places in Kern County, California
Tehachapi Mountains
Census-designated places in California